Individual dressage equestrian at the 2010 Asian Games was held in Guangzhou Equestrian Venue, Guangzhou, China from November 14 to 17, 2010.

Schedule
All times are China Standard Time (UTC+08:00)

Results
Legend
RT — Retired

Prix St-Georges

Intermediate I

Intermediate I freestyle

References
Results at FEI
Results

External links
Official website 

Individual dressage